The 1902 Victorian State election was held in the Australian state of Victoria on 1 October 1902, to elect 70 of the 95 members of the Victorian Legislative Assembly. The other 25 seats were uncontested.

There was manhood suffrage in single and multimember districts (with multiple voting), and first past the post (plurality) voting was used.

William Irvine replaced Alexander Peacock as Victorian Premier on 10 June 1902, and contested the election as the incumbent premier and leader of the conservative National Citizens' Reform League. Irvine soundly defeated the Liberals, and their Labor allies led by Frederick Bromley.

Results
The incumbent Reform League was returned with a comfortable majority, winning 47 seats, which led to the formation of the 1902 Irvine Ministry.

|}

See also
Members of the Victorian Legislative Assembly, 1902–1904

References

1902
1902 elections in Australia
1900s in Victoria (Australia)